Ride Your Heart is the debut studio album by American punk rock band, Bleached. The album was released on April 2, 2013 through Dead Oceans.

Critical reception 

Ride Your Heart has been generally well-received by contemporary music critics and journalists. On review aggregator, Metacritic, Ride Your Heart has an average rating of 70 out of 100 indicating "generally favorable reviews based on 17 Critics."

Track listing

Charts

References

External links 
 

2013 debut albums
Bleached (band) albums
Dead Oceans albums